Oakleigh South is a suburb in Melbourne, Victoria, Australia, 17 km south-east of Melbourne's Central Business District, located within the Cities of Kingston and Monash local government areas. Oakleigh South recorded a population of 9,851 at the 2021 census.

A largely residential suburb, its boundaries are North Road to the north, South Road to the south, Warrigal Road to the west and Huntingdale/Clarinda Roads to the east.

Oakleigh South Post Office opened on 1 September 1936.

History

Following the Second World War, Melbourne burst its borders and flowed into semi-rural land. The suburbs Moorabbin and Oakleigh expanded to the south-east. The end of the Second World War also saw an Australian government attitudinal change with regards to immigration. In the 1950s and 1960s, the Australian government formed agreements with many European countries and actively encouraged immigrants from southern and northern Europe. Many southern European migrants settled first in Melbourne’s inner suburbs such as Carlton and Brunswick, but as they became more financially established, and more family and friends arrived, many sought to purchase or build larger homes. Land in developing suburbs such as Oakleigh South provided an ideal opportunity for larger house blocks. Many people chose to build their own houses and local industries provided employment for many of the first generation of Greek and Italian settlers.

Education

Oakleigh South has two primary schools, Oakleigh South Primary School and Huntingdale Primary Bilingual School. The two spoken languages are English and Japanese. Oakleigh South has one secondary school, South Oakleigh Secondary College.

The Melbourne International School of Japanese, a supplementary Japanese school, holds its classes at Oakleigh South Primary.

Transport

Oakleigh South is serviced by Huntingdale railway station.

As part of the Dingley Arterial Project, Old Dandenong Road was connected to South Road, thereby linking suburbs west of Oakleigh South along South Road (such as Bentleigh, Moorabbin, and Brighton) with suburbs to the east of Oakleigh South along Old Dandenong Road (such as Heatherton and Dingley Village).

Sports

Located in southeastern Melbourne's famous Sandbelt, the area is home to three noted private golf clubs: Metropolitan Golf Club, Huntingdale Golf Club and Commonwealth Golf Club.

The Olympic Ice Skating Centre, located on Centre Road at the middle of Oakleigh South, is the oldest ice rink in Melbourne, opened on 7 July 1971. It was the only public ice rink in Melbourne until the opening of Docklands' Icehouse in 12 February 2010, and was where the Melbourne Ice of the Australian Ice Hockey League previously played up until 2009.

Parks

After the completion of the South Road Extension, Mavis Hutter Reserve was created at the corner of Carroll Road and Bourke Road. The park contains two workstations of outdoor gym equipment, a playground, and a granitic sand track. The playground comprises a slide, swings, and butterfly sculpture. The granitic sand creates a circuit in the park.

Other parks in Oakleigh South are Scammell Reserve, which contains sporting facilities and playgrounds, Dales and Talbot Parks, and Davies Reserve.

The National Trust of Australia has more than 1000 trees listed on its significant tree register. One of these trees is a flowering gum outside the Metropolitan Golf Club's clubhouse in Oakleigh South.

Demographics
The Australian Bureau of Statistics reveals the following demographic facts about Oakleigh South:

The proportion of households in Oakleigh South where Greek is the main language spoken is 14.2 per cent compared to the Australian average of 1.3 per cent. The proportion of households where Italian is the main language is 4.7 per cent compared to the Australian average of 1.6 per cent.
Many in Oakleigh South fully own their own home. The proportion of houses that are fully owned (occupant does not pay rent or mortgage) in Oakleigh South is 42.2 per cent compared to the Australian average of 32.6 per cent.
There are relatively few flats, units, or apartments. Most Oakleigh South residents own separate houses. In Oakleigh South, 3.4 per cent of dwellings are flats, units, or apartments compared to the Australian average of 14.2 per cent.

Liveability

A 2005 report called Liveable Melbourne that was commissioned by The Age and conducted by Tract Consultants and ACIL Tasman, ranked Melbourne suburbs and assigned them scores on fourteen characteristics such as crime, CBD proximity, and traffic congestion. The report found that Oakleigh South had a very low crime rate and good proximity to cafes, restaurants, and shopping facilities. Negative characteristics of Oakleigh South include lack of trams, poor proximity to schools, lack of open spaces, and little topographical variation.

Places of Worship

The Sankat Mochan Samiti temple on North Rd conducts Hindu ceremonies and services while the South Oakleigh Gospel Hall on Centre Rd conducts Sunday schools and Christian services.

See also
 City of Moorabbin – Parts of Oakleigh South were previously within this former local government area.
 City of Oakleigh – Parts of Oakleigh South were previously within this former local government area.
 Oakleigh Barracks

References

Suburbs of Melbourne
Suburbs of the City of Monash
Suburbs of the City of Kingston (Victoria)